The murder of Sir William de Cantilupe, who was born around 1345, by members of his household, took place in Scotton, Lincolnshire, in March 1375. The family was a long-established and influential one in the county; de Cantilupes traditionally provided officials to the Crown both in central government and at the local level. Among William de Cantilupe's ancestors were royal councillors, bodyguards and, distantly, Saint Thomas de Cantilupe.

The chief suspects were two neighbours—a local knight, Ralph Paynel; and the sheriff, Sir Thomas Kydale—as well as de Cantilupe's entire household, particularly his wife Maud, the cook and a squire. The staff were probably paid either to carry out or to cover up the crime, while Paynel had been in dispute with the de Cantilupes for many years; it is possible that Maud was conducting an affair with Kydale, during her husband's frequent absences on service in France during the Hundred Years' War.

The Treason Act 1351 laid down that the murder of a husband by his wife or servants was to be deemed petty treason. De Cantilupe's murder was the first to come within the purview of the Act, as were the subsequent trials of Maud and several members of her staff. Many people were indicted for the crime, although only two were convicted and, in the end, executed for it. Others were also summoned but, as they never appeared, were outlawed instead. Other influential local figures, such as the sheriff, were accused of aiding and abetting the criminals. The last trial and acquittal was in 1378, although the case had long-term consequences. No motive has been established for de Cantilupe's killing; historians consider it most likely that responsibility rested with de Cantilupe's wife, her lover, the cook and their neighbour, with a mix of motives including love and revenge.

Background
The de Cantilupes were a long-established Lincolnshire family based at Scotton in the northeast of the county. They were also major landholders in the Midlands, with estates in Greasley, Ilkeston and Withcall. The family had traditionally played an important role in both local society and central government with a history of loyal and diligent service to the crown. Not only were they lords of the realm—"one of the richest and most influential  families in fourteenth-century England", suggests the scholar Frederik Pedersen—but the family possessed Saint Thomas de Cantilupe in its ancestry, and considered themselves to be under his special protection. William de Cantilupe, 30 years old at the time of his death, was a "knight of some stature" in the region, notes the historian J. G. Bellamy, and by then had been retained by John of Gaunt.

Family tree 
The relationships between de Cantilupe, Paynel and Kydale were:

Household
Although the de Cantilupe family's main residence was Greasley Castle, Nottinghamshire, in the spring of 1375 William was staying at the manor of Scotton. This estate had come to him through his marriage to Maud Nevil, daughter of Sir Philip Nevil of Scotton.

The household, as named in later indictments, comprised: William de Cantilupe and his wife Maud; Maud's maid, Agatha Lovel; Richard Gyse, squire; Roger Cooke, the cook (who may also have been the butler or "botiller"); Robert de Cletham, the seneschal; Augustine Morpath; John Barneby de Beckingham; John de Barnaby, the household chamberlain; William Chaumberleyn; John Chaumberleyn; Walter de Hole; Henry Taskare; Augustine Forster; Augustine Warner and John Astyn. Gyse and Cooke may have been impoverished, suggests Pedersen, and so ripe for recruitment as de Cantilupe's killers.

Death of de Cantilupe
A later jury established that de Cantilupe was "at peace with God and the lord king", and Pedersen has taken this to indicate that he had prayed, and, therefore, was about to retire for the night. In a premeditated and minutely planned attack, de Cantilupe was stabbed to death with many blows. The precise date of the crime is unknown; the juries that heard the indictments offered dates varying from 13 February to 11 April 1375. Pedersen has suggested the evening of Friday, 23 March or the following Friday, as most probable. Five of the seven quarter sessions juries which subsequently sat suggested the latter, the other two decided it was the former date.

It was probably the maid, Lovel, who gave Cooke and Gyse access to de Cantilupe's room. Having killed him, according to the later court records, they washed his corpse "with heated-up water so that they not be discredited by the effusion of the blood of his wounds". The hot water cauterised de Cantilupe's wounds and (it has been suggested) made his body easier to transport; it also, suggests Pedersen, implies that they had assistance from the house's domestic staff, and, by extension, that the "entire household was involved in aiding and abetting the murder". He argues that

The corpse was placed in a sack, and the killers transported it  to the east, dumping it near Grayingham. Here they dressed the corpse in "fine garments", including a belt and spurs. Pedersen speculates that this was to present the appearance of an attack by highwaymen or footpads. The body was discovered by passers-by, who reported that, in their view, he had been killed on the road. The discovery may not have occurred for some time though, or at least not have been reported, argues Bellamy, which may account for the number of possible dates on which the crime could have been committed.

Escape
Immediately after the murder, it appears that the entire house was closed up and its staff dispersed. Pedersen suggests this was what originally indicated to the authorities that something was amiss. Those who apparently escaped to Paynel's house were Maud, Lovel, Gyse and Cooke. Paynel was an important figure in Lincolnshire society, and had been a retainer of King Edward III, although Pedersen describes him as something of a "loose cannon", due to Paynel's having been summoned several times to answer allegations of excess.

Indictments, trials and convictions
Although most of the household were later indicted for de Cantilupe's killing, it is not known who was in charge of the operation. The medievalist Rosamund Sillem has identified Paynel as the conspiracy's mastermind, for example, while Pedersen has argued that "there is a strong circumstantial case to be made that they were acting under the direction of William's wife, Maud Nevil".

Sessions of the Peace 
The case came before the commission of county coroners, headed by the sheriff, Thomas Kydale of South Ferriby, on 25 June 1375. Several charges were presented and many suspects arraigned. Maud was named as a party, although in these early proceedings there was some uncertainty as to the role she had played, some juries naming her as an instigator and others as an accessory. Her seneschal, Robert de Cletham, was charged with aiding and abetting her. Ten juries investigated over a period of some weeks. This may indicate a greater than usual effort by the Crown to establish the facts, and perhaps reflects the degree of complexity investigators encountered. The juries presenting to the justices believed the crime was committed around the Feast of the Annunciation.  They established few details of the crime, but were the first juries to level charges against the whole household.

Maud accuses 

As well as being named a suspect, Maud also lodged her own accusations against 16 men and women. Pedersen argues that, "given her almost certain complicity in the murder it must have come as a surprise to the two assassins, William’s squire, Richard Gyse, and Roger Cooke, that Maud named them as the murderers". Bellamy suggests that an accusation of this nature would have been expected of any woman who was in the house and on the scene when her husband was killed. It would not necessarily have implied complicity to her contemporaries, although it may also have been, says Pedersen, an attempt at diverting suspicion. The historian Paul Strohm has argued that, "like other women raising a hue ... she then found herself under suspicion and indictment for complicity".

King's Bench sessions 
The Court of King's Bench convened in Lincoln on 29 September 1375. Once more Kydale presided. Usually in medieval indictments the accused ranged from "unknown felons [to] notorious robbers"; the accusations against 15 members of de Cantilupe's household, Maud herself and an important local figure such as Sir Ralph Paynel were exceptional. Both the indictments of the peace sessions and Maud's June allegations were presented to the bench, and Gyse and Cooke were arraigned. Whereas the juries which presented their conclusions to the peace commission believed the crime was committed around the Feast of the Annunciation, it is with the juries presenting to the bench that a dating disparity is introduced. The King's Bench juries suggested, between them, 10 different dates spread over two months. Sillem suggests that this may be explained by the fact that, by the time they came to consider the evidence, they could only rely on memories to an event which occurred at least six months previously.

When the case was eventually heard, it was not as murder, but as petty treason, since it involved either household servants rebelling against their master, or a wife against her husband, and was the first time the 1351 Treason Act had been used against members of a household in the death of their master. The King's Bench juries deliberately used the language of treason rather than felony: : treason, lies and sedition, seditious aforethought. All of which, argues Sillem, suggested to observers this "conveyed that most heinous of crimes, treachery to the lord".

Maud withdrew her allegations—paying a fine (having made them) for doing so—and Gyse and Cooke were therefore acquitted on her charges. The jury indictments remained, however. Most of those she had accused in June had never presented themselves to court—they seem to have disappeared—and apart from Cooke and Gyse, only she and her husband's seneschal stood trial. De Cletham had been charged only with aiding and abetting by the peace sessions juries but, at the bench, he was also charged with murder, as Maud had been. They were acquitted on both that charge and one of aiding and abetting Gyse and Cooke. Maud and de Cletham were released on a bond of mainprise on the charges of aiding and abetting those other principals who had failed to appear. Paynel was charged with harbouring Maud, Lovel, Gyse and Cooke on his Caythorpe manor, and also released on mainprise until Michaelmas the following year. The only accused to be found guilty before the bench were Gyse and Cooke.

Westminster sessions
The case moved to the King's Bench at Westminster in September 1376. Members of the de Cantilupe household who had failed to appear in court were outlawed as felons. Maud and the seneschal, though, were acquitted on the charge of having aided and abetted them. Paynel was again indicted for harbouring criminals.

Kydale, Paynel and Lovel
The sheriff, Kydale, was also suspected of complicity in the crime due to his standing surety for Maud during her appearances. He was already associated with Paynel, and this may have hardened suspicions against him. One of Kydale's duties as sheriff was to select the juries that sat on the case, and by extension, that would decide Maud's guilt or innocence.

The longest trial to take place was that of Paynel. Indicted at Lincoln in 1375, he was released on mainprise until September. He was then not tried for another six months. At the Easter term King's Bench sessions held at Westminster in 1376 he was released nisi prius. Kydale was the sheriff who appointed the jury that released Paynel on mainprise, but Kydale's term ended in September 1375. As Paynel had been appointed sheriff in September 1376, he was in charge of overseeing the transfer of his own case to London. In the event, Paynel was acquitted in the last few months of his shrieval term, which expired in October. Paynel was replaced as sheriff by Kydale, whose second term of office lasted until 1378.

Sillem says that "a certain amount of mystery surrounds Agatha" the maid. Both she and Maud had been accused as both principals and accomplices—court records describe her as "notoriously suspect" in the crime—but "like so many of the accused, she failed to appear in court". Nothing is known of her as a person outside the de Cantilupe case, and her surname alternates in the documents between Lovel and Frere. In her case, though—unlike so many of her comrades—her reason for not appearing has been established. On Monday 27 August 1375 she escaped the immediate dispensing of justice by bribing her gaolers in Lincoln Castle, where she had been imprisoned awaiting trial. The castle bailiffs, Thomas Thornhaugh and John Bate, were later arrested and tried for allowing Agatha to escape justice. Thornhaugh produced witnesses who swore he was innocent of the offence; he was acquitted of felony but fined for dereliction of duty. Pedersen reports that Bate "provided a somewhat more unusual defence". Accused in July 1377 of accepting £10 to allow Agatha to flee, he produced a pardon from the new king, Richard II, absolving Bate from any malfeasance of office, and a second pardon, dated the 8th of the same month, from the late king Edward III.

Cooke and Gyse
As such, they were tried and subsequently convicted of petty treason. No motive was ever established for their role in the killings. The archivist Graham Platts notes that "the affair was so complicated that no convictions for murder were made". Although they had disappeared following their escape to Paynel's, in 1377 they were apprehended for the murder and executed for the crime (by being drawn and hanged). It is possible that they expected protection that never came. Pedersen suggests they may have been promised a form of insurance by their social betters against capture and conviction, or that if that occurred, they would be treated leniently and their families "looked after in case [Gyse and Cooke] were not able to flee the country".

Motive
Although no motive was established by the courts for the killing, historians have generally considered that Maud was romantically involved with Kydale and that they had de Cantilupe killed to facilitate their marriage. Sillem noted the close connection between Kydale and Paynel—between 1375 and 1378, she says, they "must have practically controlled the affairs of Lincolnshire"
—and argues that they both had a motive for de Cantilupe's death. Kydale's, she suggests, was that he wanted to marry Maud while Paynel wanted revenge for his perceived previous ill-treatment at the hands of the de Cantilupe family. De Cantilupe had been serving abroad in the years before his death, and it is possible that Maud and Kydale had begun a relationship in his absence. But the others' motives are more obscure, argues Pedersen. Regarding Ralph Paynel, for example:

Paynel "was no doubt acutely aware of the multitude of insults he had received at the hands of the de Cantilupes", which went back to at least 1368. In that year de Cantilupe's elder brother, Nicholas, accused Paynel and his chamberlain of leading an armed force and attacking the de Cantilupe caput baroniae at Greasley Castle. He further accused Paynel of raping Nicholas's wife, Katherine. She, however, was Paynel's daughter, and far from ravishing her, notes Pedersen, Paynel was rescuing her: de Cantilupe had imprisoned his wife in the castle after she launched an annulment suit against him. This was on the grounds of impotence, and was heard before the Archbishop of York. Nicholas died in Avignon a few months later while lobbying Pope Urban V to annul his wife's case and William inherited his brother's property. Nicholas's death was deemed suspicious, and William was arrested on suspicion of poisoning his brother with arsenic. William was on royal service in Aquitaine at the time, and Pedersen notes that "the suspicion had clearly been strong enough for the King to provide an expensive armed guard to ensure that William answered for his alleged crime in London". He was held in the Tower of London during the council's investigation, which seems to have concluded that Nicholas's death was from natural causes. William took livery of his lands in September 1370. In December he also successfully claimed three manors from Paynel that had originally been Katherine's dower. This, combined with the insult to his daughter, may have been sufficient cause for Paynel to plot against William as he had his brother.

Later events

Cooke and Gyse have been described as "remorseless" in the planning of the killing and its execution. They were the only individuals to suffer punishment in connection with de Cantilupe's murder. Others escaped, either through complicated manipulation of the law and jury rigging—for example Maud, Kydale and Ralph—or simpler, more traditional methods, such as Agatha's prison break. In the case of most of the household, no information survives on their fate or sentence. William de Hole, for example, is never mentioned on any subsequent extant court or legal document. For most of those outlawed, it is unknown whether they ever appealed their outlawry, were captured or subsequently pardoned. Although they probably remained outlawed for their absence from court, all—including Paynel—were acquitted in 1377 of harbouring criminals. Bellamy suggests that the reason the household workers ran away in the first place was probably down to the infamy the case had engendered, as a direct result of which, he says, "juries were more likely than usual to find the accused guilty". Paynel eventually joined John of Gaunt's retinue and became a valued servant to Richard II.

Not only had it effectively ended a family which, in Sillem's words, had "played a considerable part in English history", but the killing of a man by either his servants or his wife—or both—"was regarded as particularly heinous by all ranks of society". On his death de Cantilupe was the last of his line, and the family died out.
There being no remaining male heirs, the de Cantilupe estates were broken up between two senior branches of the family, represented by the de Cantilupe brothers' cousins, William, Lord de la Zouche and John Hastings, who was then a minor.

Kydale married Maud—by now "notorious"—after her acquittal. Their marriage was to be short-lived, as he was dead by November 1381. The following year Maud married Sir John Bussy. She was now a wealthy woman, bringing both large estates in her own right as well as dowers from her previous husbands. The medievalist Carol Rawcliffe suggests that "whatever apprehensions Bussy may have felt in following the short-lived Kydale as her third husband were clearly overcome by the prospect of a greatly increased rent-roll".

Maud—whom Rawcliffe described as "in her own way, as colourful a character as Bussy himself"—died in 1386. The murder cast a long shadow for her and William's staff. In what Sillem calls a "curious exception" to the unknown fates of most of those who had been outlawed, at the supplication of Queen Anne in 1387, King Richard pardoned John Tailour of Barneby, Cantilupe's steward. Sillem believes that this pardon, "so many years after the event and to apparently only one of the outlaws adds yet another element of mystery".

Historiography
Sillem's analysis of the Lincolnshire plea rolls in 1936 was the first major study of de Cantilupe's murder. She highlighted how the case not only demonstrated contemporary approaches to crime and petty treason but also provided a wealth of information on the more mundane aspects of society, such as the organisation of a late-14th century magnatial household. Her conclusion—that the murder was planned by Maud and Kydale with Paynel's assistance—led her to propose a pre-existing romantic connection between the first two, but she was unable to establish a motive for Paynel's involvement. Sillem's analysis has mostly been followed by historians of the later-20th century, although the lack of evidence as to most of the individuals' roles means that there are variations upon the theme. Rawcliffe, for example, suggests that Maud's lover was within the household—and so not Kydale—and that:

The case was "notorious", says Bellamy, as an example of carefully planned premeditated murder, planned with sufficient subtlety to thoroughly hinder the crown's ability to investigate. Platts has compared the killing of de Cantilupe to the "kind of plotting in which Shakespeare's audiences revelled" two and a half centuries later, while Bellamy suggests it "contained elements of the modern murder drama". Not least, argues Bellamy, because of the transporting of the corpse and the attempt at blaming highwaymen, elements of crime which "are rarely found in medieval records". Strohm has highlighted the role of Maud in public perception, noting how it fed into the popular perception of women generally and Maud specifically being "schemers and unworthy daughters of Eve working through gullible male accomplices seem to underlie many of the household treason narratives".

He also notes that of the numerous cases in which women are executed for killing their husbands in the latter half of the 14th century, there is only one surviving example of a wife acting on her own, without the assistance of either neighbours, family or household.

Pedersen has described the manipulation of the legal machinery as near "virtuosic", and wondered whether Maud—assuming she was a guilty party—double crossed her accomplices. Perhaps, he queries, Gyse and Cooke being "neither wealthy nor influential had something to do with it". Pedersen suggests that not only was de Cantilupe's murder cleverly planned over a long period, "it also bears all the hallmarks of ... having been put on hold until everybody was in positions of power where they could cover for each other." Apart from Gyse and Cooke, he comments, everybody else involved "got away with murder".

Notes

References

Sources

Further reading 
 Julian-Jones, Melissa (2020) Murder During the Hundred Year War: The Curious Case of Sir William Cantilupe 

1375 deaths
1375 in England
14th-century English people
14th-century murder
Crime in Lincolnshire
De Cantilupe family
Deaths by person in England
Deaths by stabbing in England
People murdered in England